Mettle (Ken Mack) is a fictional character appearing in American comic books published by Marvel Comics. He was recruited into training at the Avengers Academy to become an Avenger.

Publication history
Mettle first appeared in Avengers Academy #1 (June 2010) and was created by Christos Gage and Mike McKone. He appeared as a regular character in the series through its final issue, #39 (Jan 2013).

Mettle appeared briefly in Avengers Arena, the successor title to Avengers Academy, by Dennis Hopeless and Kev Walker.

Fictional character biography
Ken Mack was a sixteen-year-old Hawaiian surfer with a laid back and carefree attitude. While surfing, another surfer hit him with a surf board and ripped away part of his face, which revealed a red iridium skull at the point of impact. He was taken to Norman Osborn, where Dr. Baron Von Blitzschlag explained that the trauma accelerated his transformation that was already taking place. Norman Osborn further accelerated the transformation, changing Ken's body to be completely iridium.

Heroic Age
Mettle is recruited into the Avengers Academy along with five other students who have been affected by Osborn. In a sparring session with Reptil he is shown to withstand intense heat from a flame thrower with no effect. Noticing that they have been joined by Veil, he comments on her costume, but she becomes frightened by his appearance, changing into her gas form.

He is portrayed as a more responsible member of the new recruits, after discovering that they will all have a training session with Justice and Speedball. Striker complains in relation to the incident at Stamford, stating that Speedball was stupid in his battle with Nitro. Mettle instead stated that he would be the perfect teacher, given that with their abilities one wrong move, any of one them could be a potential murderer. During their training session, Speedball increases the difficulty, with Hazmat responding with a radiation blast. Justice suggests that he take a break. Then Finesse notices Speedball and Quicksilver arguing about keeping a secret from the cadets. By accessing secret computer files, the students realize that they are not the most powerful, nor the smartest or even the most highly trained kids that Osborn kidnapped. Instead they have been chosen for the academy because they have the greatest potential to go rogue and become dangerous villains.

On a visit to the Raft, Mettle, Hazmat, and Veil plan to seek out Norman Osborn in his cell to kill him for revenge. Hazmat used her power to cause a blackout, giving them enough time for Mettle to rip the Osborn's cell door. However, they let him live when Osborn said he could fix them. When the students were questioned about who cause the blackout, Mettle lied and said it seemed like fate led them to Osborn. Mettle has fought against Arsenal, Whirlwind, Mentallo, and the Absorbing Man. After a video of Tigra's assault by the Hood, Mettle refused to go with Hazmat, Veil, and Striker to get revenge.

In an attempt to bring back the Wasp, Veil mistakenly resurrects Carina Walters, Korvac senses her and arrives to take her back. When Carina refuses to go with him, Korvac attacks, but the Avengers show up to battle him. Carina temporarily transforms Mettle and his teammates to obtain powers from their future selves in order to defeat Korvac. He punches through Korvac, thinking that he killed him. It is later revealed that his future-self seemed comfortable with killing, which scares Mettle. After the fight, Mettle seeks out Hazmat in the student's lounge where they share an emotional moment knowing that they may never be cured.

At the Prom, Mettle and Hazmat shared their thoughts and feelings to each other and decided to start a romantic relationship.

Fear Itself
In the Fear Itself storyline, Mettle throws a pole at an armor robot attacking Washington D.C., killing both the pilot and gunner. He feels guilt for doing so, but Tigra reassures him that by killing him, he saved the lives of innocent civilians. When Titania and the Absorbing Man attacks the Infinite Mansion, Mettle and Hazmat chose to hold them back and sacrifice themselves in order for their teammates to escape. However, the Avengers Academy instructors show up to save them. In the aftermath of Fear Itself, Mettle and Hazmat attempt to have sex, but Hazmat was still traumatized over accidentally killing her previous boyfriend. This put further strain on their relationship, especially when X-23 joins the academy and Reptil, under the control of his future self, creates jealously.

Avengers Vs. X-Men
Mettle and the students initially do not take kindly to the junior X-Men, but eventually come to understand the difficult situation that the mutants were forced into by adult superheroes, not unlike their present situation. Mettle especially makes a connection with Loa, who is able to make the ground into waves and allows Mettle to surf once again. When Sebastian Shaw attempts to free the mutants, the Avengers Academy students side with them, so Tigra feints defeats and allows them to escape. Loa decides to stay at the academy. He and the students defend Juston Seyfert's sentinel against Emma Frost, who was powered by the Phoenix Force.

Final Exams
Mettle and Hazmat succumb to Jeremy Briggs's promise of a normal life and take the "Clean Slate". With his powers gone and a special skin graft, Mettle looks normal again. He is about to spend some private time with Hazmat, but when they hear that Jeremy is threatening their other classmates they take the antidote and Mettle's new skin is burned off by a re-powered Hazmat. He and the other students are graduated to associate members of the Avengers.

Avengers Arena and death
After finally having sex with Hazmat while the teachers (and most students) were away, Mettle is abducted alongside Hazmat, Reptil, X-23, Juston Seyfert, and a dozen others by Arcade on Christmas Eve during the Marvel NOW! event. Mettle is killed by Arcade in Murderworld, as he sacrificed himself to spare Hazmat as the weak link among the 16. When suspicions arise as to where the abductees have gone, Arcade activates the "contingency", using a remotely operated copy of Mettle to assuage the worries of Hank Pym and explain away the absence of the teen heroes. When Deathlocket stumbles into an underground facility, she sees a robotic version of Mettle; its skull is exposed to showcase its mechanical parts.

Powers and abilities
Possessing a body of living iridium, he is virtually indestructible, shown to be able to withstand the intense heat of a flame thrower. His costume is made of "unstable molecules" that Mister Fantastic designed, which is able to adjust to his powers. He has superhuman strength and durability due to his body, but he is unable to transform back into his human form. However, due to the tampering of Norman Osborn, he is unable to feel the basic of human sensations due to deteriorated nerve endings and remains closed off from the world. Mettle has been shown that he does not know his own strength and is fearful of his powers.

Before obtaining his iridium body, Ken Mack was an experienced surfer.

Other versions
Mettle appears as a zombie in Marvel Zombies Halloween, attacking Kitty Pryde and her son Peter with other zombies, but is seemingly repelled by Mephisto.

In 'Marvel Universe Vs. The Avengers' Mettle provides vital support to the defenses of Manhattan island during the cannibal plague sweeping the world.

Reception
In an article for The Philadelphia Inquirer, Jerome Maida describes Mettle as an "invulnerable powerhouse".

A review of Avengers Academy #14.1 by David Pepose for Newsarama expressed his love of the expressions artist Sean Chen gives to the characters, including Mettle "whose face still speaks volumes even as its frozen in the shape of a skull". In his review of Avengers Academy #20, Pepose called Tom Raney's depiction of the "still-faced" Mettle "absolutely heartbreaking".

References

Characters created by Christos Gage
Comics characters introduced in 2010
Fictional characters with superhuman durability or invulnerability
Marvel Comics characters with superhuman strength
Marvel Comics superheroes